Joachim Gérard (born 15 October 1988) is a Belgian wheelchair tennis player. He has been ranked world No. 1 in singles.

Gérard has won two Grand Slam singles titles (2021 Australian Open, 2021 Wimbledon Championships) and four doubles titles (2014 French Open, 2017 Australian Open, 2019 Australian Open and 2019 Wimbledon Championships).

Gérard has also won the singles title at the Wheelchair Tennis Masters in 2015, 2016, 2018 and 2019, as well as the doubles title in 2014.

He competed in wheelchair tennis at the 2020 Summer Paralympics.

Grand Slam performance timelines

Wheelchair singles

Wheelchair doubles

Awards
Belgian Paralympic Athlete of the Year (2013 & 2019)

References

External links

 
 

1988 births
Living people
Belgian male tennis players
Wheelchair tennis players
Paralympic wheelchair tennis players of Belgium
Paralympic bronze medalists for Belgium
Paralympic medalists in wheelchair tennis
Wheelchair tennis players at the 2008 Summer Paralympics
Wheelchair tennis players at the 2012 Summer Paralympics
Wheelchair tennis players at the 2016 Summer Paralympics
Wheelchair tennis players at the 2020 Summer Paralympics
Medalists at the 2016 Summer Paralympics
Sportspeople from Walloon Brabant
21st-century Belgian people